The 1952–53 Czechoslovak Extraliga season was the 10th season of the Czechoslovak Extraliga, the top level of ice hockey in Czechoslovakia. 21 teams participated in the league, and TJ Spartak Praha Sokolovo won the championship.

Group A

Group B

Group C

7th–12th place

Final

External links
History of Czechoslovak ice hockey

Czechoslovak Extraliga seasons
Czech
1952 in Czechoslovak sport
1953 in Czechoslovak sport